Youga is a surname. Notable people with the surname include:

Amos Youga (born 1992), Central African footballer, brother of Kelly
Kelly Youga (born 1985), Central African footballer